Alucita eudactyla is a moth of the family Alucitidae. It is found in Colombia, Brazil and the Antilles.

References

Moths described in 1875
Alucitidae
Moths of South America